The Frauen-Bundesliga 2000–01 was the 11th season of the Frauen-Bundesliga, Germany's premier football league. It began on 15 October 2000 and ended on 10 June 2001.

Final standings

Sportfreunde Siegen did not receive a license for 2001–02 to play in the Bundesliga. Flaesheim retired voluntary from the Bundesliga. Therefore, Heike Rheine and 1. FC Saarbrücken remained in the league.

Results

Top scorers

References

2000-01
Ger
1
Women